The 1st FESPIC Games was a multi-sport event for Far East and South Pacific athletes with a disability held in Beppu, Japan. It opened on June 1 and closed on June 3, 1975.

References

1975
FESPIC
FESPIC
FESPIC
Beppu, Ōita
Multi-sport events in Japan
International sports competitions hosted by Japan
Sport in Ōita Prefecture
FESPIC Games